National Park Podunajsko is a planned national park in Slovakia. After its creation it will be the tenth national park in the country. The park will be situated in South Western Slovakia along the borders with Austria and Hungary. The park is important for protecting a diverse variety of flora and fauna along the banks of the Danube and Morava rivers.

See also
List of national parks of Slovakia

References

National parks of Slovakia
Geography of Bratislava Region
Geography of Nitra Region
Geography of Trnava Region
Tourist attractions in Bratislava Region
Tourist attractions in Nitra Region
Tourist attractions in Trnava Region